
Year 890 (DCCCXC) was a common year starting on Thursday (link will display the full calendar) of the Julian calendar.

Events 
 By place 

 Europe 
 The Frankish nobles, who have ruled Provence in anarchy (since 887), declare Louis the Blind (a son of the late usurper King Boso) ruler of Lower Burgundy, at an assembly at Valence.  
 The sovereignty of Svatopluk I, ruler (knyaz) of Moravia, is confirmed in Bohemia.   Lusatia becomes a part of his kingdom (approximate date).

 Britain 
 King Alfred the Great begins to commission and undertake a series of translations into Old English, beginning with his own version of Pope Gregory the Great's Pastoral Care.
 Lord Æthelred II and Lady Æthelflæd (a daughter of Alfred the Great) of the Mercians found the Priory of St. Oswald in Gloucester (probably originally dedicated to St. Peter).
 Ohthere of Hålogaland, a Norse Viking seafarer, narrates the story of his travels to Alfred the Great, who arranges for it to be written down.
 King Anarawd ap Rhodri of Gwynedd makes the first ceremonial visit to an English court (that of Alfred the Great).
 King Donald II of Scotland expels the British aristocracy of Strathclyde. They flee south to North Wales.
 The town of Kirby Muxloe (in modern-day Leicestershire) is founded in England (approximate date).

Births 
 Arnulf I, count of Flanders (approximate date)
 Gilbert, duke of Lotharingia (or Lorraine) (approximate date)
 Gorm the Old, Danish Viking king (approximate date)
 Lady Ma, wife of Qian Yuanguan (d. 939) 
 Marozia of the Rule of the Harlots, Roman noblewoman (approximate date)
 Motoyoshi, Japanese prince and nobleman (d. 943)
 Olaf Feilan, Icelandic priest and chieftain (approximate date) 
 Olga of Kiev, princess and regent of Russia (approximate date)
 Reginar II, Frankish nobleman (d. 932)
 Rudolph, Frankish king (approximate date)
 Ulrich, bishop of Augsburg (approximate date)

Deaths 
 February 12 – Henjō, Japanese waka poet (b. 816)
 August 5 – Ranulf II, duke of Aquitaine (b. 850)
 Arib al-Ma'muniyya (July/August) was the poet, singer of the Abbasid Court.
 Æthelhelm, king of Wessex (approximate date)
 Abu Hatim al-Razi, Muslim hadith scholar (b. 811)
 Anandavardhana, Indian philosopher (b. 820)
 Adalard, Frankish nobleman 
 Aldalhard II, Frankish nobleman
 Ashot I (the Great), king of Armenia
 Askericus, archbishop of Paris (approximate date)
 Guthrum, Danish Viking king (approximate date)
 Land ingen Dúngaile, princess of Osraige

References